Princes End and Coseley railway station was a station built by the Oxford, Worcester and Wolverhampton Railway in 1853. It was one of two stations in Princes End, but was situated closer to Coseley, which influenced the decision in 1936 to add the 'and Coseley' tag on the end of the station name. It was situated on the Oxford-Worcester-Wolverhampton Line. The station eventually closed in 1962, along with the passenger services along the line, although the line remained open to goods trains until 22 September 1968.

The site of the station is now a small nature walk. The other side towards Tipton Five Ways has been filled in and is now mostly occupied by housing and industrial outlets.

References

Further reading

Disused railway stations in Sandwell
Railway stations in Great Britain opened in 1853
Railway stations in Great Britain closed in 1962
Former Great Western Railway stations